Gordon Alexander Wappel (born July 26, 1958) is a Canadian former professional ice hockey defenceman who played 20 National Hockey League games for the Atlanta/Calgary Flames from 1979 until 1982.  He scored one goal and one assist in his NHL career.  Wappel was a fifth round selection of the Flames in the 1978 NHL Entry Draft.  He retired following the 1982–83 season.

Career statistics

Regular season and playoffs

External links

1958 births
Living people
Atlanta Flames draft picks
Atlanta Flames players
Birmingham Bulls (CHL) players
Calgary Flames players
Canadian expatriate ice hockey players in the United States
Canadian ice hockey defencemen
Colorado Flames players
Ice hockey people from Saskatchewan
Muskegon Mohawks players
Nova Scotia Voyageurs players
Oklahoma City Stars players
Regina Pats players
Sportspeople from Regina, Saskatchewan
Tulsa Oilers (1964–1984) players